Jordan Souleymane Adéoti (born 12 March 1989) is a professional footballer who plays as a defender for  club Laval. Born in France, he represents Benin at international level.

Club career
Adéoti has played in France for Colomiers, Laval and Caen. After three seasons with Caen, he moved on a free transfer to Auxerre in June 2017. In August 2020 he signed for Norwegian club Sarpsborg 08. In January 2021 he returned to France with Annecy. In July 2021, he returned to Laval.

International career
Adéoti made his international debut for Benin in 2012. He represented them at the 2019 Africa Cup of Nations, where the team reached the quarter-finals.

Career statistics

Club

International

Honours 
Laval

 Championnat National: 2021–22

References

External links
 

1989 births
Living people
Footballers from Toulouse
Association football defenders
Citizens of Benin through descent
Beninese footballers
Benin international footballers
French footballers
French sportspeople of Beninese descent
US Colomiers Football players
Stade Lavallois players
Stade Malherbe Caen players
AJ Auxerre players
FC Annecy players
Championnat National players
Ligue 1 players
Ligue 2 players
Championnat National 3 players
2019 Africa Cup of Nations players
Sarpsborg 08 FF players
Eliteserien players
French expatriate footballers
Beninese expatriate footballers
Expatriate footballers in Norway
French expatriate sportspeople in Norway
Beninese expatriate sportspeople in Norway
Black French sportspeople